This list of Florida Atlantic University people includes current students, former students, and graduates of Florida Atlantic University. Since its opening in 1964, Florida Atlantic has awarded degrees to over 185,000 alumni.

Alumni

Athletics

Female athletes

Football

Major League Baseball

Rugby

eSports

Other
 Daniel Bluman (born 1990), Colombian-born Israeli Olympic show jumping rider
 Ben Silverman (born 1987), professional golfer
 Max von Schlebrügge (born 1977), professional soccer player with 10 caps for the Sweden national team

Business

Education

Entertainment

Government

U.S. senators, governors, and lt. governors

Cabinet members and federal officials

U.S. Congressmen

Judges, lawyers, and state officials

Non-U.S. politicians

Literature

Medicine, science and technology

Faculty
David F. Bjorklund, psychology professor, author, pioneer in evolutionary developmental psychology
Maria Fadiman, associate professor, an ethnobotanist and member of the 2006 National Geographic Emerging Explorers
Kenneth A. Jessell, former senior vice president for financial affairs, interim university provost, interim vice president for university advancement and executive director of the FAU Foundation, associate university provost, associate dean in the College of Business Administration, and assistant professor in the Department of Finance and Real Estate
J. A. Scott Kelso, neuroscientist, founder of the Center for Complex Systems and Brain Sciences
Salvatore D. Morgera, former Chair of Electrical Engineering, Fellow of the IEEE, Fellow of the AAAS, Tau Beta Pi Eminent Engineer; pioneer of the highly multidisciplinary Bioengineering Graduate Program at FAU;  Chair and Professor, Department of Electrical Engineering, University of South Florida
 Walid Phares, author, national media commentator, and expert on global terrorism and Middle Eastern affairs
 Richard Shusterman, Professor of Philosophy, pragmatist philosopher, Dorothy F. Schmidt Eminent Scholar in the Humanities, and Founder and Director of the FAU Center for Body, Mind, and Culture
 Martin K. Solomon, computer science professor, author, assistant chair of the Computer Science Engineering Department, expert on Oracle and databases
Robert P. Watson, alumnus of FAU, author, national media commentator, former candidate for the United States House of Representatives; formerly associate professor of political science at FAU
Jie Wu, professor in the College of Engineering and Computer Science, Program Director for the Networking Technology and Systems (NeTS) program of the National Science Foundation

References

Florida Atlantic University people